Tianjin Pipe Corporation Station, also known as Gangguangongsi Station, is a station of Line 9 of the Tianjin Metro. It started operations on 28 March 2004.

After the 2015 Tianjin explosions, all service to this station was suspended. The station resumed operations as  the temporary terminus of Line 9 on December 16, 2015. On June 27, 2016, service was extended to Citizen Plaza Station.

The station was named after Tianjin Pipe Corporation.

References

Railway stations in Tianjin
Railway stations in China opened in 2004
Tianjin Metro stations